Christian Viggo Morville (December 3, 1891 in Frederiksberg, Copenhagen – December 21, 1942 in Gentofte) was a Danish amateur football (soccer) player, who played one game for the Denmark national football team.

He played his entire career for Copenhagen club KB. He was a part of the Danish team at the 1912 Summer Olympics, but did not play any games. As an unused reserve player, he did not receive a medal, when Denmark won silver medals in the 1912 Olympic football tournament. Following the tournament, he played his only Danish national team game in October 1912.

The player had played in Russia in clubs "Sport" (St. Petersburg) 1913,1914 and club "Neva" (St. Petersburg) 1915, 1916 years.

References

External links
Danish national team profile

1891 births
1942 deaths
Danish men's footballers
Kjøbenhavns Boldklub players
Denmark international footballers
Olympic footballers of Denmark
Footballers at the 1912 Summer Olympics
Association football forwards
Sportspeople from Frederiksberg